Deepakba Desai (1882-1955) was a Gujarati poet from India.

Works

She collected Bhajans, devotional praises, marriage songs and biographies in Stavanmanjari (1923). She published poems on ideals from history and Puranas in Khandkavyo (1926) which shows combination of traditional and experimental new poetry. Her other works include Rasbatrisi.

See also 
 List of Gujarati-language writers

References

1881 births
1955 deaths
Women writers from Gujarat
19th-century Indian women writers
19th-century Indian writers
20th-century Indian women writers
20th-century Indian writers
Indian poets